Nowergup is a rural locality about  north of Perth, Western Australia. It is in the local government area of the City of Wanneroo.

History
The suburb of Nowergup (sometimes spelled Nowgerup in earlier documents) takes its name from Lake Nowergup. The lake name was first recorded by Surveyor General John Septimus Roe in 1841, and is a Noongar word which possibly means "place of sweet water". It was approved as a suburb name in 1982.

Geography
Nowergup is bounded by Romeo Road/Karoborup Road to the north, the proposed Mitchell Freeway to the west, Pinjar Road to the east and Hester Avenue and Wattle Avenue to the south.

At the Australian Bureau of Statistics 2011 census, Nowergup had a population of 212 people living in 81 dwellings.

Facilities
Nowergup is a sparsely populated agricultural suburb. Several plant nurseries, the Ocean View Tavern and the Nowergup Lake wetland and fauna sanctuary are situated along Wanneroo Road. The western strip between Wanneroo Road and the proposed Mitchell Freeway is approximately the northern half of the Neerabup National Park. The area also contains most of the Pinjar Pine Plantation, numerous sand and limestone quarries and a Water Corporation biosolids facility. Barbagallo Raceway, WA's premier motorsport facility, is located just beyond Nowergup's southern border.

The Nowergup railway depot is located off Hester Avenue.

References

Suburbs of Perth, Western Australia
Suburbs of the City of Wanneroo